The following article is about notable events in American soccer during the 1860s.

The 1860s were widely considered the first decade where organized forms association football codes were played in the United States, although it is uncertain whether or not it was variants of modern-day rugby football, American football or association football. The first reported types of organized ball kicking originated during the American Civil War, and following the Civil War the first official match reports for association football were reported.

Pre-1865

Oneida Football Club  
The Oneida Football Club was established in 1862 by Gerrit Smith "Gat" Miller, a graduate of the Latin School of Epes Sargent Dixwell, a private college preparatory school in Boston. At the time there were no formal rules for football games, with different schools and areas playing their own variations. This informal style of play was often chaotic and very violent, and Miller had been a star of the game while attending Dixwell. However, he grew tired of these disorganized games, and organized other recent preparatory school graduates to join what would be the first organized football team in the United States.

The team consisted of a group of Boston secondary school students from relatively elite public (state) schools in the area, such as Boston Latin School and the English High School of Boston. Organization served the club well, and it reportedly never lost a game, or even allowed a single goal.

1866

International matches 
No international matches were played during the 1866 calendar year.

Club matches 

The following are known American soccer club matches that were played in 1866.

Another match between Waukesha Town Club and Carroll College was played on October 23, 1866, but the score of the match is unknown.

1867

International matches 
No international matches were played during the 1867 calendar year.

Club matches 

No club matches were reported during the 1867 calendar year.

1868

International matches 
No international matches were played during the 1868 calendar year.

Club matches 

The following are known American soccer club matches that were played in 1868. The only reported soccer fixtures in the United States occurred in the Salt Lake City and New Orleans metropolitan areas.

1869

International matches 
No international matches were played during the 1869 calendar year.

Club matches 

The following are known American soccer club matches that were played in 1869. Reported matches primarily consisted of men's college soccer teams, mostly of Ivy League schools and military academies.

The two matches between Rutgers and Princeton are generally regarded as the first ever games of American Football.

See also 

 History of soccer in the United States
 Oneida Football Club
 Soccer in the United States

References 

1860-1869